Kadenge is a settlement in Kenya's Kisumu county.

References 

Populated places in Nyanza Province